Patinkin is a surname.

People bearing it include:
 Don Patinkin (1922–1995), Israeli-American economist and university president 
 Sheldon Patinkin (1935–2014), American author and theatrical director
 Mandy Patinkin (born 1952), American actor and vocalist
 Mark Patinkin (fl. 2020), American reporter

Jewish surnames
Yiddish-language surnames